Physicians and Dentists Building, also known as the Professional Building, is a historic office building located in the Rittenhouse Square West neighborhood of Philadelphia, Pennsylvania. It was designed by the architectural firm of Wilson Brothers & Company and built in 1896.  It is a 10-story with attic, "T"-shaped steel framed building.  It has a limestone faced front facade and brick sides.  It features a projecting entrance portico with Corinthian order columns and shallow projecting, three-sided bays.

It was added to the National Register of Historic Places in 1987.

References

Commercial buildings on the National Register of Historic Places in Philadelphia
Office buildings completed in 1896
Rittenhouse Square, Philadelphia